Electric Circus  (also known as EC) was a Canadian live dance music television program that aired on MuchMusic and Citytv from September 16, 1988 to December 12, 2003. The name originated from a nightclub that once existed at Citytv's first studio at 99 Queen Street East in Toronto.

Beginning in 1994, the show was also simulcast on MuchUSA. It had a loyal following among United States viewers, especially dance music fans. A Francophone version of Electric Circus aired on Musique Plus, broadcasting live from Montreal in the same format as the Toronto version.

Description

The MuchMusic studio on the main floor of the CHUM-City Building in Toronto was used to film the show. Audiences often spilled out onto Queen Street West, and on warm days, the windows to the studio were opened with some acts performing outside. It was common for dancers to be stationed on the CHUM-City rooftop, or even on the rooftops of buildings across the street, effectively making the surrounding neighborhood part of the set. Most music was prerecorded, but live acts were invited onto some shows, and in the 1990s guest D.J.s were also featured. The show was hosted by Monika Deol and Michael Williams until 1996, followed by Juliette Powell until 2000. The show also featured dancing floor director MC Craig F. (Craig Halket of Combat Des Clips on MuchMusic). After that, Electric Circus had a variety of hosts. The show ran for an hour and a half until 2001, when it was shortened to one hour. Two concerts were hosted annually: one at Canada's Wonderland during the summer, and another at Winterlude in Ottawa during the winter.

Like its American predecessors American Bandstand and Soul Train, Electric Circus was known for its flashy dancers. Many of these dancers became fan favorites in their own right. A couple of these dancers later graduated to hosting the show. Many of the dancers lived in the Greater Toronto Area and some regulars traveled from Niagara Falls, Montreal and Buffalo, New York for the Friday evening show.

The show's original producer, Joel Goldberg, went on to produce many music videos and a few feature films. He took a minimalist approach to the set, using nothing more than a well-run Vari-Lite installation, camera work from videographers (including George Lagogianes), talented dancers and live performances. As a result, Goldberg created a show that highlighted the music and the dancers while throwing cutaways to videos. Guest artists performed live (or live-to-track), none lip-synched. After Goldberg moved on, the set became more elaborate, the dancers' costuming became choreographed, the quality of the dancing declined, and most of the performances were lip-synced, with the exception of the DJs, who mixed the breaks as well as a short feature each episode.

In 1988, some of the original featured dancers included The WiZ, Tori G (also an editor for Citytv), WARP-1, The Hoody Boyz, Brenda C,  Kenrick Pompey (aka The Cowboy) and Tyra J. Many of the dancers were regulars at "The Club at Richard's" in Mississauga, as well as working professionally in the "Go-Go" circuit. The WiZ (also the first asked to be on the show) was also a DJ and producer, and created the first theme the show ever had, "The EC Rap," as well as a short audio "stinger" for the breaks.

In the summer of 1996, the show was completely re-imagined, with a new multi-camera film open directed by MuchMusic Creative Services producer Carl Armstrong. The series' original theme music, a instrumental of Narada Michael Walden's 1988 single "Divine Emotions," was replaced by a new show theme, "Hang On Here We Go!" (Theme to E.C).  Almost a year after the new theme went on the air, and because of viewer popularity, a full-length version of the song was released under the name Jet Fuel and featured lead vocals by Aleah D'Kos and guest vocals by a gas mask-wearing (video) K-os. The song was included on the MuchDance 97 compilation CD (6X Canadian Platinum) and Pure Dance 3 (Canadian Platinum). The song was also released on 12" vinyl and CD single with various mixes and remixes. The song charted on dance radio and in clubs across Canada in the spring of 1998 and was performed live during Electric Circus at Canada's Wonderland in front of 50,000 people that summer.  This music theme remained with the show until the last episode. The CD single by Jet Fuel is available on iTunes etc.

Guests on the show included:

Britney Spears 
Alanis Morissette
Erasure 
Avril Lavigne
Pink 
Aqua
Alice DeeJay 
Martha Wash  
Paulina Rubio 
Carl Cox
Darude 
*NSYNC 
Stars on 54 
Steps 
Anastacia 
Taylor Dayne 
Cathy Dennis 
Kylie Minogue 
Debelah Morgan 
Daft Punk 
Ralph Fiennes 
Roger Sanchez 
Bob Sinclar 
Deborah Cox
Emjay 
Robin S. 
Destiny's Child
Vengaboys 
Sarina Paris
O-Town 
Ginuwine 
Booker Huffman
Chyna 
Bow Wow 
Sash! 
Tina Cousins 
Bubba Sparxxx 
ATC 
Eiffel 65 

Dancing alumni from the show also include former CFNY-FM Producer and DJ, Edd "The Wiz" Scorpio, radio DJ Ashley Greco of the Z103.5 Morning Show and boy band b4-4, and comedians Marcus Brigstocke and Katherine Ryan.

MuchMusic aired an Electric Circus special on Christmas Day 2006 and featured an Electric Circus New Year’s Eve special on December 31, 2011. In the days before the 2011 special it was advertised as the return of Electric Circus.

MuchMusic aired Electric Circus on October 27, 2012 for Halloween.

Past hosts 
 Monika Deol (1988–1996) 
 Juliette Powell (1996–2000) 
 Nadine Ramkisson (2000–2002)
 Rick Campanelli (2002) 
 Bradford How (2002)
 Rainbow Sun Francks (2002–2003)
 Namugenyi Kiwanuka (2002–2003)
 Amanda Walsh (2002–2003) 
 Liz Trinnear (2012)
 Tyrone "T-RexXx" Edwards (2012)
 Michael Williams 
 George Lagogianes

See also

Club MTV
The Grind
Dance Party USA
The Party Machine with Nia Peeples
bpm:tv, the Canadian dance music video channel

References

Further reading
 "Electric Circus: an Oral History of Canada's Greatest Dance Music Show", Vice, March 4, 2015

External links

Much (TV channel) original programming
Dance television shows
1980s Canadian music television series
1990s Canadian music television series
2000s Canadian music television series
1988 Canadian television series debuts
2003 Canadian television series endings